Borovo Municipality is a small municipality (obshtina) in Ruse Province, Central-North Bulgaria, located along the right bank of Danube river in the Danubian Plain. It is named after its administrative centre - the town of Borovo.

The main road E85 crosses the area from south to north, connecting the province centre of Ruse with the cities of Veliko Tarnovo and respectively Pleven and Sofia.

Settlements 

Borovo Municipality includes the following 7 places (towns are shown in bold):

Demography 
The following table shows the change of the population during the last four decades.

Religion 
According to the latest Bulgarian census of 2011, the religious composition, among those who answered the optional question on religious identification, was the following:

See also
Provinces of Bulgaria
Municipalities of Bulgaria
List of cities and towns in Bulgaria

References

External links
 Official website 

Municipalities in Ruse Province